Salvethymus svetovidovi, also called the long-finned charr, is a species of salmonid fish. It is endemic to Elgygytgyn Lake in Chukotka, Far East of Russia, together with another species, the small-mouth char Salvelinus elgyticus. A third char species in the same lake is Salvelinus boganidae, the Boganid char.

Taxonomy
The long-finned char is a morphologically aberrant type of char; when scientifically first described in 1990, it was placed as the single species in Salvethymus, a new monotypic genus. It is closely related to the true chars in the genus Salvelinus and is phylogenetically placed within this genus; it is probably a sister lineage to the Arctic char (Salvelinus alpinus) complex.

References

Salvethymus
Fish of Russia
Salmonidae
Endemic fauna of Russia
Fauna of Siberia
Monotypic fish genera
Fish described in 1990